Ayn Issa Subdistrict or Ayn Issa Nahiyah  is a Syrian Nahiyah (Subdistrict) located in Tell Abyad District in Raqqa.  According to the Syria Central Bureau of Statistics (CBS), Ayn Issa Subdistrict had a population of 40,912 in the 2004 census.

References 

Subdistricts of Raqqa Governorate